Triethyl phosphite is an organophosphorus compound with the formula P(OCH2CH3)3, often abbreviated P(OEt)3.  It is a colorless, malodorous liquid.  It is used as a ligand in organometallic chemistry and as a reagent in organic synthesis

The molecule features a pyramidal phosphorus(III) center bound to three ethoxide groups. Its 31P NMR spectrum features a signal at around +139 ppm vs phosphoric acid standard.

Triethylphosphite is prepared by treating phosphorus trichloride with ethanol in the presence of a base, typically a tertiary amine:
PCl3 + 3 EtOH + 3 R3N → P(OEt)3 + 3 R3NH + 3 Cl−
In the absence of the base, the reaction of ethanol and phosphorus trichloride affords diethylphosphite ((EtO)2P(O)H). Of the many related compounds can be prepared similarly, triisopropyl phosphite is an example (b.p. 43.5 °C/1.0 mm; CAS# 116-17-6).

As a ligand
In coordination chemistry and homogeneous catalysis, triethylphosphite finds use as a soft ligand. Its complexes are generally lipophilic and feature metals in low oxidation states. Examples include the colorless complexes FeH2(P(OEt)3)4 and Ni(P(OEt)3)4 (m.p. 108 °C).

References

External links
 WebBook page for C6H15PO3

Organophosphites
Ethyl esters
Foul-smelling chemicals